The 1899 Challenge Cup was the 3rd staging of rugby league's oldest knockout competition, the Challenge Cup.

The final was contested by Oldham and Hunslet at Fallowfield Stadium in Manchester.

The final was played on Saturday 29 April 1899, where Oldham beat Hunslet 19-9 at Fallowfield Stadium in front of a crowd of 15,763. The cup was presented by Mrs Burnley, wife of the President of the Northern Union.

First round

Second round

Third round

Quarterfinals

Semifinals

Final

References

External links
Challenge Cup official website 
Challenge Cup 1898/99 results at Rugby League Project
Oldham Rugby League Player Statistics at Oldham Rugby League Heritage Trust
Player Stats at Hunslet Rugby Foundation

Challenge Cup
Challenge Cup